The Predators' Ball: The Inside Story of Drexel Burnham and the Rise of the Junk Bond Raiders, by Wall Street Journal writer Connie Bruck, largely recounts the rise of Michael Milken, his firm Drexel Burnham Lambert, and the leveraged buyout boom they helped to fuel in the 1980s.

Overview
As the book was published at the apex of the leveraged buyout boom, it was subsequently updated to also address the impending collapse of Drexel Burnham and Michael Milken's conviction on various securities and reporting violations.

The title of the book is a reference to an event that Drexel Burnham hosted annually.  Among the participants in the Predator's Ball were an array of private equity investors, corporate raiders such as Ron Perelman and Carl Icahn as well as institutional investors in high-yield bonds and management teams from companies that either had been or would be the targets of leveraged buyouts.

Michael Milken reportedly offered to pay the author for all of the copies of the book that would have been sold in exchange for stopping her work on Predators' Ball.

Notable people featured

 Herb Allen, head of investment banking firm Allen & Company
 Samuel Belzberg, founder and CEO of First City Financial Corporation  
 Leon Black, Drexel Burnham investment banker and founder of Apollo Management
 Ivan Boesky, arbitrageur implicated in the 1980s insider trading scandal
 I.W. "Tubby" Burnham, founder of Burnham & Co., later Drexel Burnham Lambert
 Fred Carr, head of First Executive Insurance
 James Dahl, Drexel Burnham bond salesman
 Donald Engel, Managing Director of Drexel Burnham from 1979 to 1984
 Theodore J. Forstmann, co-founder of buyout firm Forstmann Little & Co.
 Howard Gittis, attorney and advisor to Ronald Perelman
 Sir James Goldsmith, investor and corporate raider
 Samuel J. Heyman, investor and corporate raider
 Carl Icahn, investor and corporate raider
 Fred Joseph, CEO of Drexel Burnham Lambert
 Henry Kravis, co-founder of Kohlberg Kravis Roberts
 Dennis Levine, former Drexel Burnham investment banker
 Cy Lewis, managing partner of Bear Stearns
 Carl Lindner, Jr., investor and businessman
 Lowell Milken, Michael Milken's brother and former Drexel Burnham employee
 Michael Milken
 Nelson Peltz, investor and corporate raider
 Ronald Perelman, investor and corporate raider
 T. Boone Pickens, investor and corporate raider
 Victor Posner, investor and corporate raider
 Felix Rohatyn, investment banker
 Meshulam Riklis, investor and corporate raider
 Martin Siegel, former Kidder Peabody and Drexel Burnham investment banker
 Saul Steinberg, investor and corporate raider
 Jeffrey Steiner, investor in high yield bonds, responsible for introducing Drexel to European investors
 Lawrence Tisch, investor and head of Loews Corporation
 Gerald Tsai, investor, responsible for building Primerica
 Stephen Wynn, casino and real estate developer

References

General sources 
 "No Target Seemed to Big: The Predators' Ball.  The New York Times, July 10, 1988
 "Throwing the Book at Drexel".  TIME, June 24, 2001

Books about traders
1989 non-fiction books
Business books
Insider trading
Drexel Burnham Lambert
Books about companies
Finance books
Penguin Books books
Michael Milken